Katsalapov is a Russian masculine surname, its feminine counterpart is Katsalapova. Notable people with the surname include:

Aleksandr Katsalapov (born 1986), Russian football player
Nikita Katsalapov (born 1991), Russian ice dancer 

Russian-language surnames